Lilium Redwine, known by her recording alias Ultrademon, is an American experimental electronic musician.

Ultrademon released her debut album (titled Seapunk) via Aphex Twin's Rephlex Records in 2013, followed by a Japanese re-release in the same year.

Discography
Step into Liquid (2012): Fire for Effect Records, Rephlex
Seapunk (2013): Fire for Effect Records, Rephlex Records
Voidic Charms (2014): Coral Records Internazionale
Pirate Utopias (2014): Faded Audio
Durian Rider (2015): Coral Records Internazionale 
Chamber Music (2019): Soft Architecture 
æði (2022): Transatlantic Records

References

Living people
Musicians from Kansas
American electronic musicians
American experimental musicians
American industrial musicians
American keyboardists
Year of birth missing (living people)